The   was a Japanese domain of the Edo period. It was associated with Hyūga Province in modern-day Miyazaki Prefecture on the island of Kyushu.

In the han system, Takanabe was a political and economic abstraction based on periodic cadastral surveys and projected agricultural yields.  In other words, the domain was defined in terms of kokudaka, not land area. This was different from the feudalism of the West.

History

Takanabe was previously called Kushima; it was granted to Akizuki Tanezane by Toyotomi Hideyoshi after Tanezane's surrender during the subjugation of Kyushu in the late 1580s. Akizuki Tanezane retained control of the fief after the Battle of Sekigahara, as he had been on the side of Ishida Mitsunari but switched allegiances while in Ōgaki Castle, killing the Western Army's commanders there and opening the castle to the Eastern Army. In 1604 Tanezane moved his residence to Takanabe Castle; the domain became formally known as Takanabe 69 years later, in 1674. The domain's income rating was 30,000 koku until 1689, when the 4th generation lord, Akizuki Tanemasa, granted 3000 koku to his younger brother; Takanabe's income remained at 27,000 koku for the remainder of its history.

The famed lord of the Yonezawa Domain, Uesugi Yōzan (Harunori), was the 2nd son of the 6th generation Takanabe lord, Tanemitsu.

Takanabe's domain school, Meirin-dō, was founded in 1778; it brought great acclaim to Takanabe as a center of education.

The domain was abolished in 1871, and became Takanabe Prefecture. It passed through incorporation into various prefectures before finally becoming part of Miyazaki Prefecture. Its former ruling family became shishaku (viscounts) in 1884.

List of daimyōs 
The hereditary daimyōs were head of the clan and head of the domain.  At Takanabe. the Tokugawa shōguns granted 27,000 koku to the  Akizuki clan from the early 1600s to 1868.

Tanenaga
Taneharu
Tanenobu
Tanemasa
Tanehiro
Tanemitsu
Taneshige
Tanenori
Tanetada
Tanetomi

See also 
 List of Han
 Abolition of the han system

References

External links
"Takanabe" at Edo 300 

Domains of Japan